Uncial 0322 (in the Gregory-Aland numbering), is a Greek uncial manuscript of the New Testament, dated paleographically to the 8th or 9th-century.

Description 
The codex contains a small part of the Gospel of Mark 3:17/18-4:1; 6:10-21/22 on 2 parchment leaves of size . The text is written in two columns per page, 22 lines per page. Rubrication is 8th–9th century; text is possibly 5th–7th century. It is a palimpsest, the upper text contains Synaxarion.

History 
The manuscript is dated to the 8th or 9th-century. It was added to the list of New Testament manuscripts by the INTF in 2010.

It is currently housed at the Ecumenical Patriarchate of Constantinople (Triados 68 (75)) in Istanbul.

See also 
 List of New Testament uncials
 Biblical manuscript
 Textual criticism
 Uncial 0321

References

External links 
 

Greek New Testament uncials
Palimpsests
5th-century biblical manuscripts